Annette "Dolly" Gulley (born 27 February 1964) is an Australian tennis player who won the Swedish Open in 1984.

Gulley was born in Sydney, and trained at the Australian Institute of Sport.

Playing career
Gulley was Australian CBA Champion in her age group from 1976 to 1979 and New South Wales Under-18 Champion in 1980. In 1982, as a junior, she and compatriot Kim Staunton won the Australian Open girls' doubles.

She won the women's Swedish Open in 1984, defeating Carin Anderholm.

References

Living people
1964 births
Tennis players from Sydney
Australian female tennis players
Australian Open (tennis) junior champions
Grand Slam (tennis) champions in girls' doubles
20th-century Australian women